Pablo Rodríguez Lozada (January 4, 1923 – February 28, 1973), better known as Tito Rodríguez, was a Puerto Rican singer and bandleader. He started his career singing under the tutelage of his brother, Johnny Rodríguez. In the 1940s, both moved to New York, where Tito worked as a percussionist in several popular rhumba ensembles, before directing his own group to great success during the 1950s. His most prolific years coincided with the peak of the mambo and cha-cha-cha dance craze. He also recorded boleros, sones, guarachas and pachangas.

Rodríguez is known by many fans as "El Inolvidable" (The Unforgettable One), a moniker based on his most popular song, a bolero written by Cuban composer Julio Gutiérrez.

Early years
Rodríguez was born in Barrio Obrero, Santurce, Puerto Rico, to José Rodríguez Fuentes from San Sebastián, Puerto Rico, and Severina Lozada from Holguín, Cuba. During his childhood he aspired to be a jockey and tried out racing horses at Hipódromo Las Casas in Villa Palmera, Santurce. His older brother, Johnny Rodríguez was a popular singer and composer, who inspired the younger Rodríguez to become a musician. In 1936, 13-year-old Rodríguez joined the group of Ladislao (El Maestro Ladí) Martínez, Conjunto de Industrias Nativas, as a singer. When he was 16 years old, he participated in a recording with the renowned Cuarteto Mayarí. In 1940, Rodríguez moved to New York City shortly after his parents, José and Severina, died. He went to live with his brother Johnny, who had been living there since 1935.

Musical career

Beginnings as a musician
In New York, Rodríguez was hired as a singer and bongó player for the orchestra of Eric Madriguera. In 1941, he recorded "Amor Guajiro", "Acércate Más" (Come Closer) and "Se Fue la Comparsa". In 1942, Rodríguez joined the band of Xavier Cugat, and recorded "Bim, bam, bum" and "Ensalada de congas" (Conga Salad).

Rodríguez joined and served in the U.S. Army for one year. After he was discharged, he returned to New York where he joined the orchestra of José Curbelo. On one occasion, the band performed at the China Doll Cabaret. There he met a young Japanese chorus girl by the name of Tobi Kei (b. Takeko Kunimatsu), who eventually became his wife.

Success as a bandleader
In 1947, Rodríguez made his "solo" debut and finally organized his own band, which he named "Los Diablos del Mambo" ("the mambo devils"). He renamed his band "Los Lobos del Mambo" ("the mambo wolves") and later dropped the name altogether, deciding to go with "The Tito Rodríguez Orchestra". The first song that he recorded under the band's new name which became a "hit" was "Bésame La Bembita" (Kiss My Big Lips). In 1952, he was honored for having developed his own unique singing style (early in his career he had been heavily influenced, as had so many other singers, by the Cuban vocalist Miguelito Valdés) by the "Century Conservatory of Music of New York". His orchestra won the "Gran Trofeo Award" for two consecutive years.

In 1953, Rodríguez heard a percussionist by the name of Cheo Feliciano. He was so impressed with Feliciano that he offered him a job in his band as a band boy. Rodríguez discovered that Feliciano also knew how to sing and gave him an opportunity to sing at the popular Palladium Ballroom. Eventually, Feliciano went to work for another band, but the friendship between the two lasted for the rest of their lives. Among the other orchestras that played at the Palladium were the Machito, Tito Puente and Charlie Palmieri orchestras. The popular Latin music craze at the time was the chachachá and the mambo.

At the peak of his popularity during the 1950s, Rodríguez was only rivalled by Tito Puente in New York's Latin music circuit. Although described by historians and musicians alike (including both Titos) as "a friendly rivalry", their purported feud became a sort of urban legend in the world of Latin dance music. For example, Rodríguez's version of "Avísale a mi contrario" has been often cited as an example of this "feud", despite the fact that the song was written by Ignacio Piñeiro in 1906.

United Artists years
Rodríguez tried his luck with boleros and recorded various albums for the United Artists label, spawning various hit songs such as "Inolvidable", composed by Julio Gutiérrez, and "En la soledad", composed by Puchi Balseiro. "Inolvidable" sold over a million and a half copies world-wide in 1963. In his early 1960s orchestra his group included Cuban dancer Martha Correa, who also played the maracas. In this period he also collaborated with mainstream American jazz artists. Notably, he invited jazz players Bob Brookmeyer, Al Cohn, Zoot Sims and Clark Terry to appear with him in performances at New York City's famed Birdland nightclub. Highlights of the performances were captured on the album, Live at Birdland (1963). He also produced records for other groups, such as Los Hispanos and Los Montemar.

Later years
Rodríguez returned to Puerto Rico in 1966 and built a Japanese-style house in Ocean Park, Santurce, where he lived with his family. Rodríguez produced his own television show called "El Show de Tito Rodríguez" which was transmitted through San Juan's television Channel 7 (whose call letters were WRIK-TV at the time). Among the guest stars that appeared on his show were Sammy Davis, Jr., Tony Bennett, Shirley Bassey, Roberto Clemente and Orlando Cepeda.  Rodríguez also founded his own recording studio/label called TR Records.

Rodríguez's last public appearance was with Machito and his band on February 2, 1973, at Madison Square Garden in New York City.

Tito Rodríguez died of leukemia on February 28, 1973. He was buried at Saint Raymond's Cemetery in The Bronx, New York.

Legacy
In April 1999, Tito Rodríguez was represented by his son, Tito Rodríguez Jr., in the induction ceremonies of the International Latin Music Hall of Fame.

Tito Rodríguez's Japanese-style house in Puerto Rico is featured on tours of the San Juan metropolitan area. The aforementioned Cheo Feliciano recorded a tribute to Rodríguez honoring his memory.

In August 2010, reggae band Cultura Profética released the song "Me faltabas tú" on the album "La Dulzura", where the band plays Tito's song in a modern bolero style.

Selected discography

Represented by Columbia Records (now Sony International), most of these albums were originally recorded by the Musicor label, which was later sold to West Side Latino records. Tito Rodríguez also recorded for RCA, Seeco Records, SMC, United Artist Records and his own label, TR records.

1960 United Artists "Tito Rodríguez Live at the Palladium"
1961 WS Latino "Charanga, Pachanga"
1961 WS Latino "Tito Returns to the Palladium – Live"
1962 WS Latino "Latin Twist"
1962 WS Latino "Tito's Hits"
1962 WS Latino "Let's do the Bossanova"
1963 Palladium Records "Tito Rodríguez from Hollywood"
1963 Palladium Records "Tito Rodríguez Live at Birdland"
1963 WS Latino "From Tito With Love"
1964 WS Latino "Carnaval de las Américas"
1967 WS Latino "En la Oscuridad"
1968 WS Latino "Esta es mi Orquesta"
1969 TR Records "Inolvidable" 
1971 Fania "Tito Dice... Sepárala También" with El Sexteto La Playa
1972 Tico Records-Fania Legend "Nostalgia con Tito Rodríguez" recordings from (1949 a 1958)
1993 WS Latino "Tito Rodríguez con la Rondalla Venezolana: Eternamente"
1995 TR Records "Cindy & Tito Rodríguez: Alma con Alma"
1999 WS Latino "Tito Rodríguez con la Rondalla Venezolana: Nuevamente Juntos"

See also
List of Puerto Ricans
Mambo

Notes

References

External links
Tito Rodríguez at Music of Puerto Rico

1923 births
1973 deaths
20th-century Puerto Rican male singers
Burials at Saint Raymond's Cemetery (Bronx)
Deaths from leukemia
Puerto Rican percussionists
Timbaleros
Salsa musicians
People from Santurce, Puerto Rico
Musicians from San Juan, Puerto Rico
Singers from San Juan, Puerto Rico
RCA Victor artists